Rhodri Davies may refer to:

Rhodri Davies (musician) (born 1971), improvising harpist
Rhodri Gomer-Davies (born 1983), rugby union football player
Rhodri Talfan Davies (born 1971), director of BBC Cymru Wales
Rhodri Davies (rugby union) (born 1991), Welsh rugby union player
Rhodri Davies (football) (born 1994), goalkeeper for Wales football team